Childermass can refer to:

 the feast of the Holy Innocents on December 28
 the first part (1928) of The Human Age, a trilogy by Wyndham Lewis 
 Professor Roderick Random Childermass, a character in several books by John Bellairs
 John Childermass, Norrell's cunning and surly servant in the novel Jonathan Strange & Mr Norrell by Susanna Clarke